Yake is a surname. Notable people with the surname include: 

 Elizabeth Yake, Canadian film producer
 Terry Yake (born 1968), Canadian ice hockey player
 Wu Yake (born 1991), Chinese footballer

Place
 Yake, Somalia

See also
 
 
 Mount Yake, active volcano in Japan
 Yak (disambiguation)